Cuatro pícaros bomberos is a 1979 Argentine comedy film directed by Carlos Galettini.

Cast
Ismael Echevarría
Alberto Anchart
Gianni Lunadei
María Noel
Charlie Díez Gómez
Nelly Prono
Juan Manuel Tenuta
Jorge Villalba
Beatriz Spelzini
Marcelo José
Raúl Ricutti
Juan Carlos Lamas
Pedro Martínez
Mercedes Yardín
Manuela Bravo

External links
 

1979 films
Argentine comedy films
1970s Spanish-language films
Films directed by Carlos Galettini
1970s Argentine films